Alarm indication signal (AIS) (also called “all ones” because of the data and framing pattern) is a signal transmitted by an intermediate element of a multi-node transport circuit that is part of a concatenated telecommunications system to alert the receiving end of the circuit that a segment of the end-to-end link has failed at a logical or physical level, even if the system it is directly connected to is still working. The AIS replaces the failed data, allowing the higher order system in the concatenation to maintain its transmission framing integrity. Downstream intermediate elements of the transport circuit propagate the AIS onwards to the destination element. 

There are various AIS formats based on the signaling level of the errored circuit. When an element of T1 or (DS1) circuit loses signal (LOS) or framing (OOF), the device replaces the erroneous data bits with a series of ones. This is where the term All Ones originates.  At the DS3 signal level, the intermediate element receiving an errored signal replaces the errored channel data with a signal consisting of a valid DS3 frame with the overhead bits (the M-subframe alignment bits, M-frame alignment bits, and P bits) with the payload set to a 1010... sequence, the C bits all set to zero, and the X bits set to one. This way, the integrity of the DS3 frame is maintained even though the underlying data was compromised.

There are a number of types of AIS signals, which signal failure of different logical or physical segments of the system, including:
 Alarm indication signal path (AIS-P)
 Alarm indication signal line (AIS-L)12

These are SONET OC-xx level indications that indicate if the errored element is in a section, segment, line segment, or path segment of the SONET circuit. 

Middle 20th century analog carrier systems had Carrier Group Alarms by which the failure of a pilot signal was alerted to telephone exchange equipment, imposing an automated make-busy condition so the trunks carried by the failed system would not be used.  The improved AIS originated with the T-carrier system, and became a standard feature of subsequent plesiochronous and synchronous circuit-based communication systems, and is also part of the Asynchronous Transfer Mode standards.
As the use of Ethernet for long-distance data links has increased, the need for a similar end-to-end OA&M function has led to the development of a similar Ethernet alarm indication signal (EthAIS).

Synchronous optical networking